"No Shelter" is a song by American rock band Rage Against the Machine, released in 1998 on the Godzilla soundtrack. It can also be found as a bonus track on the Australian and Japanese release of The Battle of Los Angeles in 1999. The song is about how the mass media distracts the public from more important issues in the world and manipulates people's minds.

Lyric content
The song discusses consumerism and criticizes the feigned rebelliousness of teenaged consumerism, mentioning Nike and Coca-Cola particularly.  Its central theme, however, is media control over public sentiment.  In particular, it attacks the historical inaccuracy of Steven Spielberg’s film Amistad.

Despite appearing on the Godzilla soundtrack, the song contains the following line:

"No Shelter" made its live debut on January 23, 1999, at a surprise club show at the Troubador in West Hollywood, CA.

Critical response
Released "during the lull between Evil Empire and The Battle of Los Angeles" the band's critics held that the song's placement "in one of the biggest summer movies of 1998...reeked of selling out and hopping in bed with the enemy." In response, guitarist Tom Morello told an interviewer for Kerrang! "A lot of times a soundtrack is an opportunity to collaborate with musicians you admire. It's an opportunity to work outside of your band, or exercise -- you know, to flex your musical abilities when Rage has downtime. Out of Godzilla, we happened to get a great song in No Shelter."

Woodstock 1999
Appearing at Woodstock 1999, the band opened with the song. In a piece recalling his attendance at the performance journalist David Samuels noted "The cultural contradictions involved in [RATM's] playing agitprop to a $150-a-ticket crowd are evident from the band's first song, "No Shelter," a Marcusian anthem and also the band's contribution to the soundtrack for the movie Godzilla. It is at once an angry grad-student rant, denouncing the cultural myth that "buyin' is rebellin'," and also proof of the near-infinite capacity of that culture to absorb any criticism as long as it features kick-ass guitars."

Contextual irony
In the journal Studies in Popular Culture, scholar Jeffrey A. Hall examined the song in his essay "No Shelter in Popular Music: Irony and Appropriation in the Lyrical Criticism of Rage against the Machine". Hall noted:

Review
Billboard reviewed the song positively stating "Zack de la Rocha's word-heavy verses share the song's spotlight equally with the driving guitars, which at times pleasantly and distinctly evoke the concept--of Hendrix. The band's calculated ethos is juxtaposed with unbridled instrumental interludes that make you think that perhaps, for a moment, it could let down its guard. But tension is the act's trademark, and on No Shelter, it comes through once again."

Music video

The video has a retro 1920s "Golden Age" theme. It resembles the Industrial Revolution with scenes of workers in assembly lines, while company owners oversee the operations. The band plays throughout the video in a room that seems to be part of an abandoned building or factory. In the "board room", executives and developers plot out a sort of "helmet" with a video screen that covers the face. They experiment by putting the helmet on a teenager who is perturbed and upset. The video screen displays a mouth smiling. The executives declare the helmet a success and shake hands. They take the teenager away in a van and kill him in a remote area. Because the song was released for the 1998 film Godzilla, satirical "spoofs" of the movie's phrase "Size does matter" appear on billboards in the city scenes. They are:
 "Mumia Abu-Jamal's cell is this big" (a tiny cell) -- "Justice does matter!"
 "The crater at Hiroshima would stretch from here"... (zooms out to other end of city)... "to here." — "History does matter!"
 "Babies born into poverty in the U.S. each year would fill this building" (large building) — "Inequality does matter!"
 "Land stolen from Mexico equals five states" (darken area of US map, covering from California to Texas) — "Imperialism matters!"

Interspersed throughout is a montage depicting the Scottsboro Boys and the impending execution and death by electric chair of Sacco and Vanzetti, both historical examples of unfair trials. Tom Morello's Fender Telecaster guitar can be seen sporting communist references such as the Peruvian 'Sendero Luminoso' or Shining Path in Spanish.

References to popular culture
The song contains multiple references to popular culture, criticizing corporate advertising and capitalism. It mentions numerous products, films, brands, and other topics. Among them are Steven Spielberg, Amistad, the VCR, Fourth Reich, Americana, Coca-Cola, Rambo, Nike, and the aforementioned Godzilla series. This branding has resulted in the complete video being removed from some markets on YouTube due to threatened legal action by some of those brands.

Song appearances
 "No Shelter" was featured daily as the closing theme song on "Red Heat" on Hardcore Sports Radio Sirius channel 98 from the late fall of 2009 to mid-June 2010 at which point the show was augmented. The song is still featured as the closing before the augmented segment re-opens.
 Nick Turse mentioned the song in his book The Complex: How the Military Invades Our Everyday Lives. Turse wrote "In the late 1990s the otherwise dreadful soundtrack for Godzilla, that blockbuster-flop of a movie, featured one cut that transcended its origins. No Shelter, by rebel rap/rockers Rage Against the Machine...the group decried: 'Tha thin line between entertainment and war.' The line had by then grown thin indeed. Today, it hardly exists. The military is now in the midst of a full-scale occupation of the entertainment industry, conducted with far more skill (and enthusiasm on the part of the occupied) than America's debacle in Iraq."

References

External links

1998 singles
1998 songs
Rage Against the Machine songs
Songs about the media
Song recordings produced by Brendan O'Brien (record producer)
Anti-war songs
Protest songs
Songs written by Tom Morello
Songs written by Brad Wilk
Songs written by Tim Commerford
Songs written by Zack de la Rocha
Epic Records singles